Mitikhino is a rural locality (a village) in Verkhnevarzhenskoye Velikoustyugsky District, Vologda Oblast, Russia. The population was 4 as of 2002.

Geography 
Mitikhino is located 73 km southeast of Veliky Ustyug (the district's administrative centre) by road. Myakinnitsyno is the nearest rural locality.

References 

Rural localities in Velikoustyugsky District